DXCG (102.3 FM) The Last Days Radio is a radio station owned by Prime Broadcasting Network and operated by the Last Days Ministries. Its studios and transmitter are located at Purok Waling Waling, Brgy. Visayan Village, Tagum.

The station was formerly known as Prime Gospel Radio under Yeshua Victorious Discipler's Team from its inception in 2018 to 2020. Back then, it was located along J. Abad Santos St.

References

External links
DXCG Facebook Page

Radio stations in Davao del Norte
Christian radio stations in the Philippines
Radio stations established in 2018